Long March 2 rocket family or Chang Zheng 2 rocket family as in Chinese pinyin is an expendable launch system operated by the People's Republic of China. The rockets use the abbreviations LM-2 family for export, and CZ-2 family within China, as "Chang Zheng" means "Long March" in Chinese pinyin. They are part of the larger Long March rocket family. Development and design falls mostly under the auspices of the China Academy of Launch Vehicle Technology (CALT).

History
Long March 2 was the original model in the Long March 2 rocket family, which was derived from China's first ICBM, the DF-5. The development work began in 1970. The first rocket was launched on November 5, 1974, but the launch failed. After the failed first launch of Long March 2, its design was slightly modified and designated as Long March 2A. Long March 2A was successfully launched in 1975. The production of the Long March 2A ended in 1979.

Long March 2C and Long March 2D's first launches occurred in 1982 and 1992 respectively.

The Long March 2E was the first in the Long March rocket family to introduce liquid rocket boosters, as well as a solid rocket perigee kick stage, to improve its GTO payload capacity to satisfy the domestic and international launch market in the 1990s. It was first launched in 1992. However, the Long March 2E had problems with excessive vibration, destroying the Optus B2 and Apstar 2 satellites and damaging AsiaSat 2. After 2 failures and 1 partial failure, the Long March 2E was withdrawn from the market after just 5 years in operation.

The development of Long March 2F began in 1992 as a human-rated version of the Long March 2E. Its first launch was in November 1999 (See also Shenzhou 1). This version is the safest model in the Long March 2 family, with 11 launches and no failure record. An unmanned derivative called Long March 2F/G carries the bulkier Tiangong space laboratories.

Long March 2D and Long March 4 were developed by the Shanghai Academy of Space Flight Technology (SAST), while all others are developed by CALT.

Long March 3 

The designations Long March 2A and Long March 2B were originally applied to design studies of Long March 2 derivatives for geostationary payloads. Long March 2A would use a cryogenic third stage, and Long March 2B a hypergolic one. Neither design was finalized. The 2A design was adopted as the Long March 3.

Specifications

Launch history 

The following launch statistics are gathered from the individual Wikipedia pages of each CZ-2x variants as those pages are updated more frequently by various editors; the numbers are current as of 14 December, 2022.

Launches by rocket configurations

1970-2009

2010-2022

References

Long March (rocket family)
Vehicles introduced in 1974